The 1980 Stanley Cup playoffs, the playoff tournament of the National Hockey League (NHL) began on April 8, after the conclusion of the 1979–80 NHL season. This season saw the addition of four teams from the disbanded World Hockey Association (WHA) as expansion franchises, and thus the playoffs were also expanded from 12 to 16 teams. The expanded playoff format allowed two of those former WHA clubs, the Edmonton Oilers and the Hartford Whalers, to make the playoffs in their first season in the NHL.

The playoffs concluded on May 24 when the New York Islanders defeated the Philadelphia Flyers 5–4 to win the final series four games to two and win the Stanley Cup. It was the Islanders' first Stanley Cup win and was the first of four consecutive Stanley Cup wins.

Changes
With the league expansion from 17 to 21 teams, the playoffs were also expanded, from a 12-team tournament to a 16-team tournament. The sixteen teams were composed of the four divisional champions plus the top 12 finishers of the remaining 17 teams. The 16 qualifying teams were then seeded based on regular season points, with divisional rankings ignored. Division leaders no longer received first round byes. The teams were seeded 1 through 16, with the top team playing the 16th team in the first round, and so on.  In subsequent rounds, matchups were similarly arranged, with the top remaining seed against the lowest remaining seed, and so on. The Preliminary Round was expanded to be a best-of-five set, up from a best-of-three. The Atlanta Flames played their final playoff games in this postseason, and moved to Calgary soon after; the playoffs returned to Atlanta in 2007.

Playoff seeds

The sixteen teams that qualified for the playoffs are ranked 1–16 based on regular season points.

 Philadelphia Flyers, Patrick Division champions, Clarence Campbell Conference regular season champions – 116 points
 Buffalo Sabres, Adams Division champions, Prince of Wales Conference regular season champions – 110 points
 Montreal Canadiens, Norris Division champions – 107 points
 Boston Bruins – 105 points
 New York Islanders – 91 points
 Minnesota North Stars – 88 points
 Chicago Black Hawks, Smythe Division champions – 87 points
 New York Rangers – 86 points
 Atlanta Flames – 83 points
 St. Louis Blues – 80 points
 Toronto Maple Leafs – 75 points
 Los Angeles Kings – 74 points
 Pittsburgh Penguins – 73 points (30 wins)
 Hartford Whalers – 73 points (27 wins)
 Vancouver Canucks – 70 points
 Edmonton Oilers – 69 points

Playoff bracket

Preliminary round

(1) Philadelphia Flyers vs. (16) Edmonton Oilers

This was the first playoff series meeting between these two teams.

(2) Buffalo Sabres vs. (15) Vancouver Canucks

This was the first playoff series meeting between these two teams.

(3) Montreal Canadiens vs. (14) Hartford Whalers

This was the first playoff series meeting between these two teams.

(4) Boston Bruins vs. (13) Pittsburgh Penguins

This was the second playoff series meeting between these two teams. This was a rematch of the previous year's Stanley Cup Quarterfinals, which Boston won in a four-game sweep.

(5) New York Islanders vs. (12) Los Angeles Kings

This was the first playoff series meeting between these two teams.

(6) Minnesota North Stars vs. (11) Toronto Maple Leafs

This was the first playoff series meeting between these two teams.

(7) Chicago Black Hawks vs. (10) St. Louis Blues

This was the second playoff series meeting between these two teams. Chicago won the only previous meeting in five games in the 1973 Stanley Cup Quarterfinals.

With their victory in Game one, Chicago snapped a record 16-game losing streak in the Stanley Cup playoffs.

(8) New York Rangers vs. (9) Atlanta Flames

This was the first playoff series meeting between these two teams. Game four was also the final home game for the Flames in Atlanta, as the franchise was sold and relocated to Calgary during the offseason.

Quarterfinals

(1) Philadelphia Flyers vs. (8) New York Rangers

This was the third playoff series meeting between these two teams. Both teams split their previous two meetings. This was a rematch of the previous year's Stanley Cup Quarterfinals, which New York won in five games.

(2) Buffalo Sabres vs. (7) Chicago Black Hawks

This was the second playoff series meeting between these two teams. Buffalo won the only previous meeting in five games in the 1975 Stanley Cup Quarterfinals.

(3) Montreal Canadiens vs. (6) Minnesota North Stars

This was the second playoff series meeting between these two teams. Montreal won the only previous meeting in six games in the 1971 Stanley Cup Semifinals. This was Montreal's first playoff series loss since losing to Buffalo in the 1975 Stanley Cup Semifinals.

(4) Boston Bruins vs. (5) New York Islanders

This was the first playoff series meeting between these two teams.

Semifinals

(1) Philadelphia Flyers vs. (4) Minnesota North Stars

This was the second playoff series meeting between these two teams. Philadelphia won the only previous meeting in six games in the 1973 Stanley Cup Quarterfinals.

(2) Buffalo Sabres vs. (3) New York Islanders

This was the third playoff series meeting between these two teams. New York won both previous meetings in consecutive years, the latter of which was a four-game sweep in the 1977 Stanley Cup Quarterfinals.

Stanley Cup Finals

This was the second playoff series (and only Finals) meeting between these two teams. Philadelphia won the only previous meeting in seven games in the 1975 Stanley Cup Semifinals.

Ken Morrow became the first player in history to win an Olympic Gold Medal and the Stanley Cup in the same season. Game six was the last NHL game to air on American network television for nearly ten years.

See also
1979–80 NHL season
List of NHL seasons
List of Stanley Cup champions

References

 

Stanley Cup playoffs
playoffs